Ulster Bank is a large retail bank, and one of the traditional Big Four Irish clearing banks. The Ulster Bank Group is subdivided into two separate legal entities: National Westminster Bank PLC, trading as Ulster Bank (registered in England and Wales and operating in Northern Ireland); and Ulster Bank Ireland DAC (UBIDAC – registered in the Republic of Ireland). The headquarters of Ulster Bank in the Republic of Ireland are located on George's Quay, Dublin, whilst the headquarters of Ulster Bank Northern Ireland are in Donegall Square East, Belfast, and it maintains a large sector of the financial services in both the UK and the Republic of Ireland.

Established in 1836, Ulster Bank was acquired by the London County and Westminster Bank in 1917. As a wholly-owned subsidiary of National Westminster Bank (NatWest), it became part of the Royal Bank of Scotland Group in 2000. RBS Group was renamed NatWest Group in 2020. However, the Ulster Bank brand is used on the island of Ireland. The bank has 146 branches in the Republic of Ireland and 90 in Northern Ireland, with over 1,200 non-charging ATMs. It has over 3,000 employees and over 1.9 million clients.

On 19 February 2021, NatWest Group announced a phased withdrawal of all banking activity and associated services within the Republic of Ireland. On 3 May 2021, the business of Ulster Bank Limited in Northern Ireland was transferred to the parent National Westminster Bank as part of a court-approved Banking Business Transfer Scheme.

History

Ulster Bank was founded as The Ulster Banking Company in Belfast, Ulster, in 1836, by a breakaway faction of shareholders in the newly formed National Bank of Ireland, which had been founded in 1835, who objected to the latter bank's plan to invest profits from the bank in London rather than in Belfast. The founding directors of the bank were John Heron, Robert Grimshaw, John Currell, who was a linen bleacher from Ballymena, and James Steen, a Belfast pork curer.

Note destruction
In 2002, three Ulster Bank employees were arrested on charges of theft and money laundering. The three were responsible for the destruction of old banknotes at the bank's former Waring Street cash centre. Between November 2001 and February 2002, they were accused of stealing approximately UK£900,000 of used banknotes designated for disposal. The money was then placed in various bank and building society accounts. On 23 January 2004, the men were jailed for two and a half years for the theft of £770,000. Lord Chief Justice Sir Brian Kerr criticised the bank's security measures during the trial.

First Active
In 2003–04, Ulster Bank Group purchased First Active, Ireland's oldest building society, for €887 million. In 2009, the First Active branch network and business of several hundred thousand savers and borrowers was merged with Ulster Bank, and the brand name was retired in 2010.

Computer failure

In June 2012, a computer system failure prevented customers from accessing accounts. Initial estimates that the problem would be sorted out within a week were wildly optimistic, with thousands of customers still unable to access their accounts into late July 2012, with ongoing issues still not resolved by mid-August 2012. This RBS / NatWest / Ulster Bank issue has proved to be one of the largest IT failures the world has ever known. Ulster Bank (the smallest part of the RBS group) was to initially set aside £28 million for compensation to customers.

Tracker mortgage scandal 
In the Republic of Ireland from 2008, Ulster Bank Ireland dac encouraged customers on tracker mortgages to switch to the more-profitable fixed rate mortgages as interest rates on tracker mortgages, which is set to the European Central Bank borrowing rate plus 1%, reduced significantly due to the 2008 financial crisis. As part of this, mortgage customers were not told about the risks of moving to a fixed rate, and were instead encouraged with the offer of constant mortgage repayments and interest. Other customers were offered a temporary switch to a fixed rate mortgage, with the promise of being moved back to a tracker rate after a time period, which did not occur until customers complained as per a company policy introduced in 2011.

In 2015, the Central Bank of Ireland opened an investigation into the lenders which sold tracker mortgages, finding KBC Bank Ireland, Permanent TSB, Bank of Ireland and AIB were also among those complicit in denying customers correct rates. On 25 March 2021, the Central Bank of Ireland fined Ulster Bank Ireland DAC €37.774 million, after discovering 5,940 customers had been directly affected by the scandal, along with 49 separate regulatory breaches.

Future

In March 2014, it was reported that the then RBS Group was considering merging the bank in the Republic of Ireland with some of its rivals in order to reduce its holding. RBS Group's annual results for 2013 revealed Ulster Bank had operating losses of £1.5 billion and accounted for a fifth of the parent group's total bad debt charges. In October 2014, RBS confirmed it would retain Ulster Bank following improved market conditions in Ireland.

In September 2020, The Irish Times reported that NatWest was considering closing all Ulster Bank operations in the Republic of Ireland, a process that would take around six years. The bank would continue to operate in Northern Ireland.

In February 2021, following an extensive review, NatWest Group confirmed plans to withdraw Ulster Bank from the Republic of Ireland, with a "phased withdrawal" over the "coming years".

Ulster Bank began freezing certain current and deposit accounts in the Republic of Ireland on 11 November 2022, which were to be closed 30 days later, as part of its staggered process of eventually closing all such accounts. Twenty-five of their branches closed on 6 and 13 January 2023 and were taken over by Permanent TSB. The remaining 63 branches will close on 21 April 2023.

Services

Ulster Bank provide a full range of banking and insurance services to personal, business and commercial customers.

In Northern Ireland, as a trading name of National Westminster Bank PLC, the bank is authorised by the Prudential Regulation Authority and regulated by both the Financial Conduct Authority and the Prudential Regulation Authority. National Westminster Bank PLC is a member of the Financial Services Compensation Scheme and UK Finance. In the Republic of Ireland, the bank is regulated by the Central Bank of Ireland.

The bank provides a Debit Mastercard to customers with their current accounts, in addition to other financial services. It launched 15 new commitments to its retail customers in September 2010.

Corporate identity

From 1968 until 2005, Ulster Bank used the three arrowheads device of National Westminster Bank, its owner. The bank adopted the RBS "daisy wheel" logo and typeface design in October 2005. The bank is one of the four banks that issue pound sterling banknotes in Northern Ireland.

Banknotes

In common with the other Big Four banks of Northern Ireland, Ulster Bank retains the right to issue its own banknotes. These are pound sterling notes and equal in value to Bank of England notes, and should not be confused with banknotes of the former Irish pound.

Ulster Bank's current notes all share the same design of a view of Belfast Harbour flanked by landscape views; the design of the reverse is dominated by the bank's coat of arms. The principal difference between the denominations is their colour and size. Notes incorporate a foil patch security feature depicting the bank's logo.

 5 pound note, grey
 10 pound note, blue-green
 20 pound note, purple
 50 pound note, blue

In November 2006, Ulster Bank issued its first commemorative banknote – an issue of one million £5 notes commemorating the first anniversary of the death of former Northern Irish and Manchester United footballer, George Best. This was the first Ulster Bank banknote to incorporate the RBS "daisy wheel", and the entire issue was taken by collectors within hours of becoming available in bank branches.

In 2019, Ulster Bank issued a new series of banknotes printed in polymer, which replaced its paper equivalents that were previously in circulation.

Sponsorship
On 8 February 2008, Ulster Bank Group Chief Executive, Cormac McCarthy, announced a three-year sponsorship deal worth over £1 million for the Belfast Festival at Queen's. It was hailed as a "new dawn" for the festival which had been suffering underfunding.

Ulster Bank was the first overall sponsor of The Balmoral Show in 2009, Northern Ireland's largest agricultural show.

Ulster Bank announced official sponsorship of the GAA All-Ireland Senior Football Championship in April 2008.

See also

NatWest Holdings
NatWest Markets

References

External links

Ulster Bank Group
Ulster Bank Northern Ireland
Ulster Bank Ireland DAC Registered in the Republic of Ireland, No. 25766

Banks established in 1836
Banks of Northern Ireland
NatWest Group
Ulster
Banks of Ireland
1836 establishments in Ireland
Brands of Northern Ireland
Banks under direct supervision of the European Central Bank